Pop Quiz is a British television quiz programme that originally aired on BBC1 from 4 July 1981 to 28 December 1984 with a Top of the Pops special on 4 January 1994 hosted by Mike Read. It was then revived from 21 May to 9 July 1994 on the same channel but this time hosted by Chris Tarrant. It was revived again on Red TV from 14 June to 30 August 2008 with Mike Read returning as host; he also hosted two specials on BBC Four in December 2016 and January 2017.

Format
The teams are made up of three pop stars with one acting as team captain, although no permanent team captains. Guests who have appeared as captains include Bev Bevan, Dave Edmunds, Robert Plant, Phil Lynott, Bob Geldof, Roger Taylor, Cliff Richard, Midge Ure, George Michael, John Taylor, Phil Collins, David Gilmour, Dave Gahan and Ian Gillan.  Occasionally, non-musical guests such as Paula Yates, John Peel, or the double act of Syd Little and Eddie Large also appeared as guests.

The Red TV version featured civilians instead of celebrities.

Rounds
The show has both team and individual rounds. The individual rounds see each player given a song then asked a question about the song (like a guest player on the recording), asked to identify three different artists who sang the same song in the correct order, or asked to name a song where a certain lyric appears. Team rounds include a naming a list of number one hits by a group, a compilation of songs of a particular theme where the teams guess the artist, or identifying a mystery guest from a clip (as in A Question of Sport), along with identifying the song playing backwards over the clip. Each episode ended with a quick-fire round of music trivia questions.

Transmissions

Series

Specials

Theme tune
The theme tune is called "The Saturn Stomp" and was composed by Howard Massey, it was released as a single in 1981. "The Saturn Stomp" was rerecorded for the fourth series, and rearranged by Marc Sylvan for the 2016 specials.

References

External links

Musical game shows
1981 British television series debuts
2017 British television series endings
1980s British music television series
1990s British music television series
2000s British music television series
2010s British music television series
BBC television game shows
British panel games
1980s British game shows
1990s British game shows
2000s British game shows
2010s British game shows
British television series revived after cancellation